Ordishia is a genus of moths in the family Erebidae.

Species
Ordishia albofasciata
Ordishia cingulata
Ordishia fafner
Ordishia godmani
Ordishia klagesi
Ordishia rutilus

References
Natural History Museum Lepidoptera generic names catalog

Phaegopterina
Moth genera